In 1922, the largest labour-oriented party in Manitoba, Canada, was the Independent Labour Party.  In the provincial election of 1922, the ILP had to compete with other labour candidates from both the left and the right.

The more conservative train unionists nominated two candidates to stand for Winnipeg: James Winning and F. W. McGill.  These candidates ran under the Union Labour banner, and were associated with remnants of the old Dominion Labour Party. They also appear to have been affiliated with the Canadian Labour Party.  Neither candidate was successful, and no further candidates were offered under this label in later years.

See also
 List of Manitoba political parties

Provincial political parties in Manitoba